Nothing but the Truth is the sixth studio album (and seventh album) by Son Seals, produced by Seals and Bruce Iglauer and released by Alligator Records in 1994. Seals wrote only four songs: "Life Is Hard", "I'm Gonna Take It All Back", "Frank and Johnnie", and "Little Sally Walker". The rest of the album consists of cover songs, including Hound Dog Taylor's "Sadie". John Randolph played rhythm guitar; Red Groetzinger and Dan Rabinovitz, horns; Noel Neal and Johnny B. Gayden, bass; David Russell, drums.

Bill Dahl, writing for AllMusic, rated the album four out of five stars but called its front cover "grotesque [and] an abomination." Rolling Stone rated it four and half stars out of five.

Track listing
"Adding Up" – 5:07
"Good Woman Bad" – 4:38
"Before the Bullets Fly" – 4:19
"I'm Gonna Take It All Back" – 6:05
"Life Is Hard" – 4:12
"Tough As Nails" – 3:09
"Your Friends" – 6:13
"Sadie" – 6:07
"Frank And Johnnie" – 4:26
"Can't Hear Nothing But The Blues" – 6:35
"Little Sally Walker" - 4:34
"Tricks Of The Trade" - 4:41

References

External links
 Alligator Records

1994 albums
Son Seals albums
Albums produced by Bruce Iglauer
Alligator Records albums